Hippotion is a genus of sphinx moths. The genus was erected by Jacob Hübner in 1819.

Species

Ecology

Pollination
Several species of the genus Hippotion have been identified as likely pollinators of the orchid species Cyrtorchis okuensis.

Gallery

References

 
Macroglossini
Taxa named by Jacob Hübner
Moth genera